Chittagong Port Authority (CPA) is a government agency of Bangladesh responsible for the management, maintenance and governance of the country's major port of Chittagong, located in the city of Chittagong on the Karnaphuli River nine nautical miles from the shore of the Bay of Bengal of the Indian Ocean. The CPA is part of the Ministry of Shipping.

Chair of Chittagong Port Authority
Rear Admiral M Shahjahan is the current chair of CPA.

History
The port of Chittagong has been in operation since at least the 4th century BC, and in modern times was governed by Port Commissioners and the Port Railway following the Port Commissioner's Act of 1887 in British India. After the partition of India in 1947 and a subsequent rise in port traffic, the modern Chittagong Port Authority began its existence in 1960 as the Chittagong Port Trust. Due to continued expansion and lack of effective governance, after the Bangladesh Liberation War the Port Trust was granted semi-autonomous status within the government, and renamed to Chittagong Port Authority, in 1976.

Gallery

See also
 Government of Bangladesh
 Transport in Bangladesh
Bangladesh Marine Fisheries Academy

References

External links
  Cpa.gov.bd: official Chittagong Port Authority website

Port authorities
Government agencies of Bangladesh
Karnaphuli River
Water transport in Bangladesh
Organisations based in Chittagong
Organizations established in 1976
1976 establishments in Bangladesh
Economy of Chittagong
Port authorities in Bangladesh